The Island Inside  is a 2009 film directed by Dunia Ayaso and Félix Sabroso.

Plot
Three siblings try fighting the schizophrenia they inherited from their father.

Cast

References

External links

2009 films
2009 drama films
2000s Spanish-language films
Schizophrenia
Films about psychiatry
Films scored by Lucas Vidal
Spanish drama films
2000s Spanish films